Tomkowa  is a village in the urban-rural Gmina Jaworzyna Śląska, within Świdnica County, Lower Silesian Voivodeship, in south-western Poland. It was located in Germany prior to 1945.

References

Villages in Świdnica County